Krofička is a mountain in the eastern part of the Kamnik Alps. Together with Ute Peak and nearby Strelovec Peak, it forms a barrier between the Logar Valley and the Roban Cirque. The southern part descends steeply to Škrbina, with which it is connected with Ojstrica. The eastern side is very steep, and grassy on the upper part, and on the western side it descends into a gorge. There is a nice panoramic view at the top.

Starting place 
 Solčava, Logar Valley
 Solčava, Roban Cirque

Routes 
 2½h: from  Koča na Klemenči jami pod Ojstrico hut, over Puklovc 
 3h: from Koče na Klemenči jami pod Ojstrico hut, over Škrbino 
 5½h: From the Roban Cirque, via the Knez Pasture

External links 
 Map (Geopedia)
 Krofička on summitpost.org
 Krofička on hribi.net Route Description and Photos (slo)

Mountains of the Kamnik–Savinja Alps
Mountains of Styria (Slovenia)
Two-thousanders of Slovenia